Arindam Bagchi is an Indian diplomat and civil services officer. He is a 1995 batch officer of the Indian Foreign Service. Currently he is the Official Spokesperson of the Ministry of External Affairs. He has previously served as Indian ambassador to Croatia from November 2018 to June 2020. His previous assignments include deputy high commissioner to Sri Lanka, and director in the Prime Minister's Office.

Early life 
Bagchi has been an investment banker for two years before joining the Indian Foreign Service. He has done his graduation in mathematics from the St. Stephen’s College, and post-graduation in management from the Indian Institute of Management Ahmedabad.

See also 

 Anurag Srivastava

References 

Living people
Indian diplomats
Indian Foreign Service officers
Year of birth missing (living people)